Santo Tomas, officially the Municipality of Santo Tomas, is a 4th class municipality in the province of La Union, Philippines. According to the 2020 census, it has a population of 40,846 people.

Geography

Barangays
Santo Tomas is politically subdivided into barangays. These barangays are headed by elected officials: Barangay Captain, Barangay Council, whose members are called Barangay Councilors. All are elected every three years.

Climate

Demographics

Economy

Government
Santo Tomas, belonging to the second congressional district of the province of La Union, is governed by a mayor designated as its local chief executive and by a municipal council as its legislative body in accordance with the Local Government Code. The mayor, vice mayor, and the councilors are elected directly by the people through an election which is being held every three years.

Elected officials

Tourism

Santo Tomas has attractions and interesting points.

Santo Tomas' coastal areas are suitable for fishing, hence, making the town famous worldwide for its Damortis dried fish (daing stalls along the national highway) local trade, and exports. Local puto, Bibingka, Nilatekan, and Patopat are the delicacies expertly prepared by the locals.

The town holds its Daing Festival held every April 20 and annual town Fiesta every April 24 and 25. Its Pamahalaang Bayan (Municipal Town Hall) is nestled on top of a hill.

The town boasts of the Agoo–Damortis Protected Landscape and Seascape and the 2002.10-hectare BFAR Mariculture Park-Portal project at south-western portion of Barangay Narvacan cove which has 2 Cage Structures, a Mooring system, Boundary Markers, Floating Guard House and Wharf. Its marketing facility is at Damortis Fish Port and Ice Plant.

DENR designated Regional Center for Inland Fisheries Research, Santo Tomas is proud of its Institute of Fisheries (fisheries and fishery education diploma courses about fisheries technology with major in different fields). In this regard, the town's "Nutri-Enriched Seaweed Noodles" bagged the First Place in the Aquatic Technology Competition and Marketplace, Phil. Council Aquaculture and Marine Research and Development on January 28, 2010.

La Union's Damortis barangay of Santo Tomas is dubbed as the 'Tabo-an of the North’ because of its priceless 'danggit' (often associated with the small malaga), the dalag-baybay, espada, sapsap, pusit, turay, dilis, and shrimp, a local fish, 1 foot basasong, dried bangus (milkfish), patis (fish sauce), alamang, and bagoong.

Shrine of Nuestra Señora del Mar Cautiva Parish Church

The natives are deeply religious as demonstrated by their devotion to the Senora Virgen del Mar Cautiva (Virgin of the Sea, patron saint of the town fishermen, whose Feast Day is celebrated every 26 April) at Poblacion, and the Holy Guardian Angels Parish Church.

Santo Tomas' cultural treasure is the 1785 Holy Guardian Angels Parish Church, which celebrates the Patronal Fiesta on October 2. Its Parish Priests are Father Raul S. Panay & Fr. Emmanuel Bahiwag under the Vicariate of St. Francis Xavier under Vicar Forane, Fr. Joel Angelo Licos, under the jurisdiction of the Roman Catholic Diocese of San Fernando de La Union (Latin: Dioecesis Ferdinandopolitanus ab Unione, Dioecesis Ferdinandopolitana ab Unione, Suffragan of Lingayen – Dagupan), a diocese of the Latin Church of the Roman Catholic Church in the Philippines. The diocese was established in 1970 from the Archdiocese of Nueva Segovia.

In 1845, Padre Santiago Romero, Kura Paroko's devotion to the "Virgin of the Rosaries" caused the carving of 3 religious statues for the Church: the Blessed Mother, St. Michael the Archangel, and the Holy Guardian Angels (patron of the Church).

"Matutina" through the China Sea is held yearly on July, where the 3 images are inserted in 3 boxes and delivered to Santo Tomas by sailboat.

In Bolinao, Pangasinan, Jolo pirates seized the "Matutina" and threw the 3 boxes of the statues into the sea, after severing the left forearm of the Virgin Mary. The 2 boxes sank but the Virgin's miraculously floated dry and sent to the Santo Tomas' parish priest.

Nuestra Señora del Mar Cautiva statue was enthroned at the Church on July 19, 1845, amid innumerable miracles, conversions, healing, including safe and easy childbirth.

Augustinian friar, Padre Lorenzo Rodriguez replaced the holy statue's lost arm with a golden forearm, then with an ivory arm but to no avail, until the natives merely used metal strings to tie the same, until this day.

Gallery

References

External links

La Union Website
 [ Philippine Standard Geographic Code]
Philippine Census Information
Local Governance Performance Management System

Municipalities of La Union